is the 12th single by Japanese idol duo Wink. Written by Neko Oikawa and Takashi Kudō, the single was released on October 16, 1991, by Polystar Records.

Background and release 
"Haitoku no Scenario" was written and composed as a fusion of Russian traditional music and 1970s disco, themed around a lonely man living in a cold Siberian town. Like the duo's previous single "Manatsu no Tremolo", the song was used by Panasonic for their RQ-S35 and RQ-S35V headphone commercial. The B-side, "Jūnigatsu no Orihime", is a Japanese-language cover of Zoe Haywood's "My World".

"Haitoku no Scenario" peaked at No. 3 on the Oricon's weekly charts and sold over 196,000 copies.

Track listing 
All lyrics are written by Neko Oikawa; all music is arranged by Satoshi Kadokura.

Chart positions 
Weekly charts

Year-end charts

References

External links 
 
 

1991 singles
1991 songs
Wink (duo) songs
Japanese-language songs
Songs with lyrics by Neko Oikawa